Die Rettungsflieger is a TV series in which fictitious missions of a rescue helicopter are displayed. The series, which was produced by Studio Hamburg and premiered by ZDF from 1997 to 2007, tries to preserve the closeness to reality in some aspects despite the undisputed entertainment character of the presentation.

See also
List of German television series

External links
 

1997 German television series debuts
2007 German television series endings
Aviation television series
Television shows set in Hamburg
German-language television shows
ZDF original programming